Ilgaz, formerly Koçhisar, is a town in Çankırı Province in the Central Anatolia region of Turkey. It is the seat of Ilgaz District. Its population is 7,825 (2021). It lies at the southern foot of the Ilgaz Mountains, that extend between Çankırı and Kastamonu provinces. The mountain is home to ski resorts.

References

External links
Ilgaz 

Ski areas and resorts in Turkey
Populated places in Çankırı Province
Ilgaz District
Towns in Turkey